Chicora was a legendary Native American kingdom or tribe said to exist in present-day South Carolina.

Chicora may also refer to:
Chicora, Pennsylvania, a borough in Butler County, Pennsylvania, USA
Chicora, Michigan, an unincorporated community in Cheshire Township, Allegan County, Michigan, USA
CSS Chicora, a Confederate naval vessel that fought in the American Civil War
 Chicora Wood Plantation, NRHP in Georgetown, South Carolina
Francisco de Chicora, a native from present-day South Carolina kidnapped by Spanish explorers in 1521